Telos Publishing Ltd. is a publishing company, originally established by David J. Howe and Stephen James Walker, with their first publication being a horror anthology based on the television series Urban Gothic in 2001. The name comes from that of the fictional planet Telos from the long-running British science fiction television series Doctor Who.

History
Since being formed, Telos Publishing Ltd. has published a wide variety of works, from original novellas based on Doctor Who to original horror and fantasy novels. They also produce a variety of unofficial guide books to popular television and film series, as well as the Time Hunter series of novellas. Starburst magazine called them "perhaps the UK's best-known independent publishers of Doctor Who books".

Telos have employed many unknown writers, in addition to works by established and award-winning authors.

Telos, and its co-founders, have been nominated for a variety of awards in their own right, such as the Canadian Prix Aurora Award, and the British Fantasy Awards, where they won the PS Publishing Award for Best Small Press in 2010 and 2011. One of their publications, the Doctor Who novella Small Gods by Jonathan Blum and Kate Orman, won an Aurealis Award for Best Australian Science Fiction Novel, the first television tie-in to receive a major science-fiction award. Christopher Fowler's novella Breathe won the British Fantasy Society Award for best novella in 2005. In 2006, Telos' founders Howe and Walker won the World Fantasy Award for Best Non-Professional for their publishing work.

Authors of note published by Telos
Authors published by Telos Publishing have included Juliette Benzoni, William S Burroughs, Simon Clark, Paul Finch, Christopher Fowler, Neil Gaiman, Hank Janson, Tanith Lee, George Mann, Graham Masterton, Fiona Moore, Simon Morden, Mike Ripley, Alan Stevens, Sam Stone, and co-founders Stephen James Walker and David J. Howe.

List of Doctor Who novellas

Time and Relative by Kim Newman (features the First Doctor and Susan) (November 2001)
Citadel of Dreams by Dave Stone (features the Seventh Doctor and Ace) (March 2002)
Nightdreamers by Tom Arden (features the Third Doctor and Jo Grant) (May 2002)
Ghost Ship by Keith Topping (features the Fourth Doctor) (August 2002)
Foreign Devils by Andrew Cartmel (features the Second Doctor, Jamie and Zoe) (November 2002)
Rip Tide by Louise Cooper (features the Eighth Doctor) (January 2003)
Wonderland by Mark Chadbourn (features the Second Doctor, Ben and Polly (April 2003)
Shell Shock by Simon A Forward (features the Sixth Doctor and Peri Brown (June 2003)
The Cabinet of Light by Daniel O'Mahony (features an Unspecified Doctor, spawned the Time Hunter novels) (July 2003)
Fallen Gods by Jon Blum and Kate Orman (features the Eighth Doctor) (August 2003)
Frayed by Tara Samms (feature the First Doctor and Susan) (October 2003)
The Eye of the Tyger by Paul J. McAuley (features the Eighth Doctor) (November 2003)
Companion Piece by Robert Perry and Mike Tucker (features the Seventh Doctor and Catherine) (December 2003)
Blood and Hope by Iain McLaughlin (features the Fifth Doctor, Peri and Erimem (January 2004)
The Dalek Factor by Simon Clark (features an unspecified incarnation of the Doctor) (February 2004)

Time Hunter novellas

A series focused on "time sensitive" Honoré Lechasseur and "time channeler" Emily Blandish, characters first introduced in Telos' Doctor Who novella The Cabinet of Light.

The Winning Side by Lance Parkin (November 2003)
The Tunnel at the End of the Light by Stefan Petrucha| (March 2004)
The Clockwork Woman by Claire Bott (June 2004)
Kitsune by John Paul Catton (October 2004)
The Severed Man by George Mann (December 2004)
Echoes by Iain McLaughlin and Claire Bartlett (April 2005)
Peculiar Lives by Philip Purser-Hallard (July 2005)
Deus Le Volt by Jon de Burgh Miller (January 2006)
The Albino's Dancer by Dale Smith (June 2006)
The Sideways Door by R.J. Carter and Troy Riser (August 2006)
Child of Time by George Mann and David J Howe (August 2007)

References

External links
 Telos website

 
Book publishing companies of Wales
Publishers of Doctor Who books
Denbighshire